Robert J. Murphy (December 26, 1866 – December 13, 1904) was a pitcher in Major League Baseball in 1890 for the New York Giants and Brooklyn Gladiators.

References

1866 births
1904 deaths
Major League Baseball pitchers
New York Giants (NL) players
Brooklyn Gladiators players
19th-century baseball players
Albany Senators players
Baseball players from New York (state)
Plainfield Crescent Cities players